Events from the year 1961 in Michigan.

The top stories in Michigan in 1961, as selected by Associated Press newspaper, radio, and television editors, were as follows: (1) the opening of the state's Constitutional Convention; (2) the negotiations between the United Auto Workers (UAW) and automobile manufacturers; (3) the Detroit Tigers' bid for the American League pennant with 101 wins during the 1961 season; (4) the Republican party's victory in an October 1961 election for control of the Constitutional Convention; (5) the November 7 election of Jerome Cavanagh, a 33-year-old attorney, over the incumbent, Louis Miriani, as Mayor of Detroit; (6) Chrysler Corporation's legal troubles arising from the removal of William Newberg as president and the ouster of L. L. Colbert as CEO; (7) "Tractors for Freedom", a Detroit-based campaign led by Walter Reuther, Eleanor Roosevelt, and Milton S. Eisenhower that raised money in May and June 1961 in an effort to trade 500 tractors to Cuba in exchange for the freedom of 1,214 rebel prisoners captured at the Bay of Pigs Invasion; (8) the proposal to create a national recreation area at Sleeping Bear Dunes; (9) the failed prosecution and trial of Gordon Watson and Nelle Lassiter for the murder of her husband, Parvin "Bill" Lassiter; and (10) the closure by Norge, a division of Borg-Warner, of its factory in Muskegon Heights and relocation of manufacturing operations Fort Smith, Arkansas.

Office holders

State office holders
 Governor of Michigan: John Swainson (Democrat)
 Lieutenant Governor of Michigan: T. John Lesinski (Democrat) 
 Michigan Attorney General: Paul Adams/Frank J. Kelley (Democrat)
 Michigan Secretary of State: James M. Hare (Democrat)
 Speaker of the Michigan House of Representatives: Don R. Pears (Republican)
 Majority Leader of the Michigan Senate: Frank D. Beadle (Republican)
 Chief Justice, Michigan Supreme Court:

Mayors of major cities

 Mayor of Detroit: Louis Miriani
 Mayor of Grand Rapids: Stanley J. Davis
 Mayor of Flint: Charles A. Mobley
 Mayor of Saginaw: R. Dewey Stearns/G. Stewart Francke
 Mayor of Dearborn: Orville L. Hubbard
 Mayor of Lansing: Ralph Crego/Willard I. Bowerman, Jr. (Republican)
 Mayor of Ann Arbor: Cecil Creal

Federal office holders

 U.S. Senator from Michigan: Patrick V. McNamara (Democrat)
 U.S. Senator from Michigan: Philip Hart (Democrat) 
 House District 1: Thaddeus M. Machrowicz (Democrat)/Lucien N. Nedzi (Democrat)
 House District 2: George Meader (Republican)
 House District 3: August E. Johansen (Republican)
 House District 4: Clare Hoffman (Republican)
 House District 5: Gerald Ford (Republican)
 House District 6: Charles E. Chamberlain (Republican)
 House District 7: James G. O'Hara (Democrat)
 House District 8: R. James Harvey (Republican)
 House District 9: Robert P. Griffin (Republican)
 House District 10: Elford Albin Cederberg (Republican)
 House District 11: Victor A. Knox (Republican)
 House District 12: John B. Bennett (Republican)
 House District 13: Charles Diggs (Democrat)
 House District 14: Louis C. Rabaut (Democrat)
 House District 15: John Dingell Jr. (Democrat)
 House District 16: John Lesinski Jr. (Democrat)
 House District 17: Martha Griffiths (Democrat)
 House District 18: William Broomfield (Republican)

Population

Sports

Baseball

 1961 Detroit Tigers season – Under manager Bob Scheffing, the Tigers compiled a 101–61 record (the sixth best win percentage in franchise history) and finished in second place in the American League, eight games behind the New York Yankees. First baseman Norm Cash led the major leagues with a .361 batting average and a .487 on-base percentage. Other Tigers who led the majors in 1961 included outfielder Al Kaline with 41 doubles, second baseman Jake Wood with 14 triples, and pitcher Frank Lary with 22 complete games.  The team's other statistical leaders included Rocky Colavito with 45 home runs and 140 RBIs, Frank Lary with 23 wins, and Terry Fox a 1.41 earned run average.
 1961 Michigan Wolverines baseball team - Under head coach Don Lund, the Wolverines compiled a 20–11 record and won the Big Ten Conference championship. Richard Syring was the team captain. Other notable players included catcher Bill Freehan (.446 batting average in 1961) and pitchers Mike Joyce, Fritz Fisher, and Dennis McGinn (2.14 ERA in 1961).

American football

 1961 Detroit Lions season – The Lions, under head coach George Wilson, compiled an 8–5–1 record and finished in second place in the NFL's West Division. The team's statistical leaders included Jim Ninowski with 1,921 passing yards, Nick Pietrosante with 841 rushing yards, Gail Cogdill with 956 receiving yards, and Jim Martin with 70 points scored.
 1961 Michigan State Spartans football team – Under head coach Duffy Daugherty, the Spartans compiled a 7–2 record and were ranked No. 8 in the final AP Poll. The team's statistical leaders included Pete Smith with 630 passing yards, George Saimes with 451 rushing yards, and Lonnie Sanders with 247 receiving yards. 
 1961 Michigan Wolverines football team – Under head coach Bump Elliott, the Wolverines compiled a 6–3 record. The team's statistical leaders included Dave Glinka with 588 passing yards, Dave Raimey with 496 rushing yards, and Bennie McRae with 210 receiving yards. 
 1961 Detroit Titans football team – Under head coach Jim Miller, the Titans compiled a 5–4 record. The team's statistical leaders included Jerry Gross with 1,126 passing yards and Vic Battani with 358 rushing yards.
 1961 Western Michigan Broncos football team – Under head coach Merle Schlosser, the Broncos compiled a 4–4–1 record.
 1961 Central Michigan Chippewas football team – Under head coach Kenneth "Bill" Kelly, the Chippewas compiled a 2–8 record. 
 1961 Wayne State Tartars football team – Under head coach Harold D. Willard, the Tartars compiled a 1–6 record.
 1961 Eastern Michigan Hurons football team – Under head coach Fred Trosko, the Hurons compiled an 0–8–1 record.

Basketball

 1960–61 Detroit Pistons season – Under head coach Dick McGuire, the Pistons compiled a 34–45 record. The team's statistical leaders included Bailey Howell with 1,815 points and 1,111 rebounds, and Gene Shue with 530 assists.
 1960–61 Detroit Titans men's basketball team – The Titans compiled an 18–9 record under head coach Bob Calihan. Dave DeBusschere led the team with an average of 22.1 points per game.
 1960–61 Michigan State Spartans men's basketball team – Under head coach Forddy Anderson, the Spartans compiled a 7–17 record. Dick Hall led the team with an average of 16.3 points per game.
 1960–61 Michigan Wolverines men's basketball team – Under head coach Dave Strack, the Wolverines compiled a 6–18 record. John Tidwell led the team with an average of 19.2 points per game.
 1960–61 Western Michigan Broncos men's basketball team – Under head coach Don Boven, the Broncos compiled a 10–14 record.

Ice hockey

 1960–61 Detroit Red Wings season – Under head coach Sid Abel, the Red Wings compiled a 25–29–16 record and lost to the Chicago Black Hawks in the 1961 Stanley Cup Finals. The team's statistical leaders included Norm Ullman with 28 goals and Gordie Howe with 49 assists, and 72 points. The team's regular goaltenders were Hank Bassen and Terry Sawchuk.
 1960–61 Michigan Wolverines men's ice hockey season – Under head coach Al Renfrew, the Wolverines compiled a 16–10–2 record. 
 1960–61 Michigan Tech Huskies men's ice hockey team – Under head coach John MacInnes, Michigan Tech compiled a 16–13 record.
 1960–61 Michigan State Spartans men's ice hockey team – Under head coach Amo Bessone, the Spartans compiled an 11–16 record.

Golf

 1961 U.S. Open - Gene Littler won the 61st U.S. Open, played between June 15 and June 17 at Oakland Hills Country Club in Bloomfield Township. The crowds of 20,439 spectators on Saturday and 47,975 overall set U.S. Open records.
 Buick Open - Jackie Burke won the Buick Open, defeating Billy Casper and Johnny Pott in a Monday playoff on July 3 at the Warwick Hills Golf and Country Club in Grand Blanc, Michigan.
 Michigan Open – John Barnum of Grand Rapids successfully defended his Michigan Open championship (his fourth Michigan Open championship), defeating Max Evans in a sudden-death playoff at the Farmington Country Club on August 21.

Boat racing
 Port Huron to Mackinac Boat Race – The Sixth Girl was the 28th boat to cross the finish line but was declared the winner on July 24 based on its nine-hour handicap.  The Dyna, out of Sturgeon Bay, Wisconsin, was the first boat to cross the finish line.
 APBA Gold Cup - Despite failing to win a single heat, Bill Muncey, a Detroit native driving the Miss Century 21 Thriftway Stores, won his third Gold Cup race, the unlimited hydroplane world championship, on Pyramid Lake in Nevada on August 28. Muncey won a total of eight Gold Cup races between 1956 and 1979.
 Silver Cup Race - Bob Hayward, the world power boat champion, was killed when his boat, the Miss Supertest II, crashed in the third heat of the Silver Cup Race on the Detroit River on September 10. Ron Musson won the race in his boat, the Miss Bardahl. The Miss Bardahl went on to win five of six Gold Cup races between 1963 and 1968.

Music
 Runaway by Grand Rapids native Del Shannon was released in February and rose to No. 1 on the Billboard Hot 100.
 I Want a Guy, the debut single from The Supremes with lead vocals by Diana Ross, was released on March 9 on the Tamla label.
 Let Your Conscience Be Your Guide, the debut single from Marvin Gaye, was released on May 25 on the Tamla label.
 Oh Mother of Mine, the debut single from The Temptations, was released on July 24 on the Miracle label. Another single from the group, Check Yourself, was released on November 7 and became a regional hit.
 Please Mr. Postman, the debut single from The Marvelettes, was released in August 1961 on the Tamla label. It became a No. 1 hit on the Billboard Hot 100 and R&B charts. It was the first Motown song to reach No. 1 on the Billboard Hot 100 -- Shop Around had previously reached No. 2.

Chronology of events

January

February

March

April

May

June

July

August

September

October
 October 8 - Otis M. Smith, the Michigan Auditor General, was appointed to the Michigan Supreme Court by Gov. Swainson. Smith was the first African-American appointed to the state's highest court.

November

December

Births
 January 9 - Al Jean, screenwriter and producer (The Simpsons, ALF, It's Garry Shandling's Show), in Farmington Hills, Michigan
 January 11 - Ali Haji-Sheikh, placekicker at Michigan (1980-1982) and in NFL (1983-1987), in Ann Arbor, Michigan
 January 17 - Keith Bostic, safety for Michigan (1979-1982) and in NFL (1983–1990), in Ann Arbor, Michigan
 February 5 - Tim Meadows, actor and comedian and one of the longest-running cast members on Saturday Night Live, in Highland Park, Michigan
 March 9 - Rick Steiner, professional wrestler, in Bay City, Michigan
 April 24 - Roger Mayweather, boxer (held world titles as a super featherweight and as a light welterweight) and trainer (for Floyd Mayweather Jr.), in Grand Rapids, Michigan
 May 7 - Lisa Rainsberger, last American woman to win a Boston Marathon (1985), in Battle Creek, Michigan
 May 20 - Lisa Kron, actress and playwright won the  Tony Award for Best Original Score and Best Book of a Musical for Fun Home, in Ann Arbor, Michigan
 June 4 - El DeBarge, singer-songwriter, producer and musician, in Detroit
 July 7 - Dean Hamel, defensive tackle in NFL (1985-1990), in Detroit
 August 18 - Bob Woodruff, television journalist, in Bloomfield Hills, Michigan
 August 29 - Jeff Kellogg, Major League Baseball umpire since 1991 and 5x World Series umpire, in Coldwater, Michigan
 September 28 - Gregory Jbara,  Tony Award-winning film, television and stage actor (Billy Elliot the Musical), and singer, in Westland, Michigan
 October 10 - Brian Diemer, track athlete who won bronze medal in 3000m steeplechase at 1984 Olympics, in Grand Rapids, Michigan
 October 24 - Rick Margitza, jazz tenor saxophonist, in Dearborn, Michigan
 October 26 - Matt Crouch, televangelist and filmmaker, in Muskegon, Michigan
 November 29 - Tom Sizemore, actor (Saving Private Ryan, Black Hawk Down), in Detroit
 December 24 - Mary Barra, CEO of General Motors since 2014, in Royal Oak, Michigan

Gallery of 1961 births

Deaths
 January 8 - Schoolboy Rowe, pitcher for the Detroit Tigers (1932–1942) and 3× All-Star, at age 50 in El Dorado, Arkansas
 April 15 - Mary Chase Stratton, ceramic artist and co-founder of Pewabic Pottery, at age 94 in Detroit
 July 17 - Ty Cobb, player for the Detroit Tigers (1905–1926) and 12× AL batting champion, at age 74 in Atlanta
 September 1 - Eero Saarinen, architect and industrial designer noted for his neo-futuristic style, at age 51 at the University Medical Center in Ann Arbor, Michigan
 September 26 - C. E. Wilson, President of General Motors (1941-1953), U. S. Secretary of Defense (1953-1957), at age 71 in Norwood, Louisiana
 October 9 - George G. Sadowski, U.S. Congressman (1933-1951), at age 58 in Utica, Michigan
 November 12 - Louis C. Rabaut, U.S. Congressman (1935-1961), at age 74 in Hamtramck, Michigan
 December 27 - Tommy Hughitt, American football player for Michigan (1912-1914) and in pro football (1917-1924), at age 69 in Bartow, Florida

Gallery of 1961 deaths

See also
 History of Michigan
 History of Detroit

References